Euclidia munita is a moth of the family Erebidae first described by Jacob Hübner in 1813. It is found in Ukraine, south-western Russia, Kazakhstan, Tajikistan, Turkmenistan, Kyrgyzstan, northern Iran, Afghanistan, China and Mongolia.

The wingspan is about 32 mm.

The larvae feed on Glycyrrhiza species.

References

Moths described in 1813
Euclidia